HMS Truncheon (pennant number P353) was a group three T Class submarine of the Royal Navy which entered service in the last few months of World War II. So far she has been the only ship of the Royal Navy to be named Truncheon. She was sold to Israel in 1968 and commissioned into the Israeli Sea Corps as INS Dolphin.

Career

As HMS Truncheon
At the end of the war, all surviving Group 1 and Group 2 boats were scrapped, but the group 3 boats (which were of welded rather than riveted construction), were retained and fitted with snorkel masts.

Truncheon was sold to the Israeli Navy in 1968, and renamed Dolphin.

As INS Dolphin
The submarine was purchased by Israel in 1968. Two of her T-class sisters, HMS Turpin and HMS Totem, were also sold to Israel. She was commissioned into the Israeli Sea Corps in 1968.

She was eventually scrapped in 1977. By the time of her decommissioning, she was the only T class submarine in service in the world.
The lead boat of the new  commissioned in 1999 carried on the name Dolphin.

Footnotes 

 
 

 

British T-class submarines of the Royal Navy
Ships built in Plymouth, Devon
1944 ships
World War II submarines of the United Kingdom
British T-class submarines of the Israeli Navy